Teresa Ann Savoy, FRSA (18 July 1955 – 9 January 2017) was a British actress who appeared in a number of Italian films.

Biography
Savoy was 18 years old when she appeared in the Italian adult magazine Playmen (October 1973), using an alias of "Terry". "Terry", who fled from home at 16, was living in a hippie community in Sicily and soon became an attention of the press.

In 1974, her acting career began when film director Alberto Lattuada (who discovered Federico Fellini and Silvana Mangano) gave her first role in the film Le farò da padre aka La bambina, playing an intellectually disabled girl named Clotilde.

Her next film was Private Vices, Public Pleasures (Vizi privati, pubbliche virtù) (1975) directed by the Hungarian director Miklós Jancsó. The film told the story of the Crown Prince Rudolf, son of the Austrian-Hungarian Emperor Franz Joseph and his rebellion against his father. Teresa played the baroness Mary Vetsera, Rudolf's lover, but in Jancso's vision, she appears as an intersex person.

In 1975 Savoy met Tinto Brass and they worked together in the successful film Salon Kitty (1976). In the film she played a young BDM girl (League of German Maidens, a female Nazi youth organization) who becomes a spy that poses as a prostitute for the SS Nazi paramilitary organization. In 1979 Brass directed her again as Drusilla in the controversial film Caligula.

In 1977 Savoy played Jamilah in the Italian film made for TV Sandokan alla riscossa! (Sandokan to the Rescue) based on the Sandokan novels by Emilio Salgari.

Savoy made a return to cinema in 1981 with La disubbidienza by Aldo Lado, where she played Edith, an attractive Jewish governess. The film covered events under the reign of the Republic of Salò. In the same year, director Miklós Jancsó worked with her again in the film A zsarnok szíve, avagy Boccaccio Magyarországon (The Tyrant's Heart) in which she played alongside Ninetto Davoli.

At this point the stardom of Teresa had faded and she was relegated to supporting roles in obscure movies and TV Series. In 1982, she had a cameo in the TV mini-series  (The Charterhouse of Parma, 1982), directed by Mauro Bolognini. In 1984, she was a terrorist in the low budget movie Il ragazzo di Ebalus (The Boy from Ebalus) alongside Saverio Marconi. In 1986, she took the part of Maria di Gallese, the first wife of the writer and poet Gabriele D'Annunzio (played by Robert Powell), in the film D'Annunzio, directed by Sergio Nasca. Still in 1986, she appeared in La Donna del Traghetto, directed by Amedeo Fago.

In 2000, she made her last film appearance in La fabbrica del vapore, the first Italian digital movie.

She received the title of Fellow of the Royal Society of Arts in 1989.

Death
Savoy died of cancer on 9 January 2017 in Milan, where she lived with her husband and two children.

Legacy

In 2021 spanish journalist and writer Martín Llade published on Editorial Berenice the novel "Lo que nunca sabré de Teresa" in which he reconstructs Savoy's life and career.

Filmography

References
3.  "Teresa Ann Savoy, la niña a la que se tragó el cine erótico". larazon.es. 18 september 2021.

External links

1955 births
2017 deaths
English film actresses
Actresses from London
English expatriates in Italy